Błażej Telichowski (born 6 June 1984) is a Polish professional footballer who plays as a striker for Wiara Lecha Poznań. He spent most of his career playing as a defender, before switching to a forward position at a later stage of his career.

Club career

He started his professional career with Lech Poznań.

In May 2011, he joined Zagłębie Lubin on a two-year contract.

International career
Telichowski was also a member of Poland U21 team.

Honours
Lech Poznań
Polish Cup: 2003–04
Polish Super Cup: 2003–04

Dyskobolia Grodzisk Wielkopolski
Polish Cup: 2006–07
Ekstraklasa Cup: 2006–07, 2007–08

References

External links
 

1984 births
Living people
Polish footballers
Poland under-21 international footballers
Dyskobolia Grodzisk Wielkopolski players
Polonia Warsaw players
Lech Poznań players
Association football defenders
Arka Gdynia players
Polonia Bytom players
Zagłębie Lubin players
Górnik Zabrze players
Podbeskidzie Bielsko-Biała players
GKS Bełchatów players
Miedź Legnica players
Ekstraklasa players
I liga players
II liga players
III liga players
People from Nowy Tomyśl County
Sportspeople from Greater Poland Voivodeship